Jaguar II may refer to:

 Jaguar Mark II, a saloon car from UK carmaker Jaguar Cars
 Jaguar 2 (RakJPz.4), a Cold War era West German tank destroyer
 Jaguar II, an aero engine from Armstrong Siddeley, see Armstrong Siddeley Jaguar

See also
 Jaguar (disambiguation)
 II (disambiguation)
 2 (disambiguation)